Graeme Miles (1935 – 29 March 2013) was an English songwriter based in Middlesbrough. Born in Greenwich, London, he grew up in Teesside and studied at West Hartlepool Art School. His songs included "Sea Coal", "Blue Sunset" and "Ring of Iron". 

During late 1982 and early 1983, Teesside Folk Group The Wilson Family, of Billingham, collaborated with Miles to produce their debut album, "Horumarye", the first album dedicated solely to Miles' works.

Miles' "A Great Northern River" was included on The Unthanks' 2012 album Songs from the Shipyards. They also performed his song "Sad February" on their 2007 album Here's the Tender Coming.

The Graeme Miles Bursary, established in his memory, is open to artists and groups between the ages of 18 and 25 who are based in the Northeast of England. Funded by the proceeds of concerts organised by The Unthanks, it is administered by the English Folk Dance and Song Society. The Rachel Hamer Band received a bursary in 2016.

References

External links
 
Ailsa MacKenzie: Obituary – Graeme Miles, The Living Tradition, issue 96, 2013

1935 births
2013 deaths
English songwriters
People from the Royal Borough of Greenwich
People from Middlesbrough